Sir Charles Wright Macara, 1st Baronet (1845–1929) was a British cotton spinner and textile industrialist.

Life
He was born in the manse at Strathmiglo on 11 January 1845, the son of Rev William Macara (1812-1889), a minister of the Free Church of Scotland, and his wife, Charlotte Grace Cowpar of Kirriemuir.

Charles Macara was educated privately and at Edinburgh. He was employed in 1862 in Manchester. In 1880 Macara was made chairman and managing director of Henry Bannerman & Sons (Ltd.) and Bannerman Mills Co. (Ltd.).

Motivated by the Southport and St Anne's lifeboats disaster, he founded in 1891, under the auspices of the Royal National Lifeboat Institution, the Lifeboat Saturday Movement to provide charity for the widows and orphans of drowned crew members. Marion Macara assisted him and founded the Ladies Lifeboat Guild. He directed the Lifeboat Saturday Movement, throughout the United Kingdom, until 1896. The initial Lifeboat Saturday raised over £5,000 and featured a parade of bands, floats and lifeboats through the streets of Manchester; it was the first recorded charity street collection. Similar parades were subsequently held in other Lancashire cities. The Lifeboat Saturday Movement provided collecting-boxes and organised door-to-door charitable solicitations and was the precursor of the Royal National Lifeboat Institution Flag Day.

In 1911 he was created a baronet. He received many foreign honours, including Chevalier de la Légion d'honneur and Chevalier de l'Ordre de Léopold.

He died in Bucklow in Cheshire on 2 January 1929.

Family

In January 1875 he married Marion Young (1848–1938), a cousin of Sir Henry Campbell-Bannerman of the Manchester firm of Henry Bannerman & Sons, cotton spinners and textile merchants.

Sir Charles and Lady Marion Macara had two sons and four daughters. Their elder son William Cowper Macara (1875–1931) inherited the title. Their younger son Charles Douglas Macara (1885–1891) did not survive until adulthood.

Selected publications

See also
Macara baronets

References

1845 births
1929 deaths
Baronets in the Baronetage of the United Kingdom
Scottish industrialists
British textile industry businesspeople
Textile manufacturers of England
People from Fife
19th-century Scottish businesspeople
20th-century Scottish businesspeople